Hollywood Cycle is an American reality documentary television series that premiered on July 7, 2015, on E! television network. The reality show chronicles both the professional and personal lives of several instructors, including Nichelle Hines, Aaron Hines, and Nick Hounslow, as well as the trainees, who all work at the indoor cycling studio Cycle House in Los Angeles.

Episodes

Broadcast
In Australia, the series premiered on the local version of E! on July 15, and July 12, 2015 in the United Kingdom.

References

External links 
 
 
 

2010s American television talk shows
2015 American television series debuts
2015 American television series endings
English-language television shows
E! original programming
Television shows set in Los Angeles